The King's Cup is an international football tournament organised in Thailand by the Football Association of Thailand. The host, Thailand, is a participant in every edition. The tournament was founded in 1968, and has been held every year since, with the exception of 1983, 1985, 2008, 2011, 2014, 2020 and 2021. In some years, the competition has featured club or invitational teams as well as international sides. Various prominent footballers have participated in this tournament, including Cha Bum-kun, Sunil Chhetri, Peter Schmeichel, Jesper Olsen, Brian Laudrup, Henrik Larsson, Robert Lewandowski, Martin Škrtel, Milan Škriniar, Pierre-Emerick Aubameyang.

Venues

Tournaments

Teams' achievements

*/** Trophy shared or place shared
1 ''Sweden and Finland represented players from Scandinavian leagues only

Medals by nations (1968–2022)
Update after 2022 King's Cup (48th).

 Note 1: Gold shared in 1976, 1977 and 1980 and not awarded silver in this years.
 Note 2: Third place shared in 1972, 1979, 1980, 1995 and 2013.

See also
 Thai football records and statistics
 LG Cup
 Dynasty Cup

Notes

External links
 King's Cup results RSSSF

 
Thai football friendly trophies
International association football competitions hosted by Thailand
International men's association football invitational tournaments
Recurring sporting events established in 1968
1968 establishments in Thailand
Football cup competitions in Thailand